The Hook and Ladder No. 1 and Hose Co. No. 2 is a property in Grand Forks, North Dakota that was listed on the National Register of Historic Places in 1982.  It is locally significant as one of two fire stations built by the city in 1907.  The other, at time of NRHP nomination, was condemned.

It is no longer used as a fire station.

The property was covered in a 1981 study of Downtown Grand Forks historical resources.

References

Fire stations completed in 1907
Fire stations on the National Register of Historic Places in North Dakota
Defunct fire stations in North Dakota
National Register of Historic Places in Grand Forks, North Dakota
1907 establishments in North Dakota